, officially , is a district of Chiyoda, Tokyo, Japan. As of April 1, 2007, its population is 629. Its postal code is 101-0024.

This district is located on the northeastern part of Chiyoda Ward. It borders Taitō 1-chōme, Taitō to the north; (across Kiyosubashi-dōri Avenue) Asakusabashi, Taitō to the east; (across Sakumagakkō-dōri Avenue) Kanda-Sakumachō, Chiyoda to the south; and (across Shōwa-dōri Avenue) Kanda-Matsunagachō, Chiyoda to the west.

As a business district, Izumichō is home to the headquarters of YKK Group, world's largest zipper manufacturer, and Toppan Printing, one of the Nikkei 225 companies of Japan.

Education
 operates public elementary and junior high schools. Izumi Elementary School (和泉小学校) is the zoned elementary school for Kanda-Izumichō. There is a freedom of choice system for junior high schools in Chiyoda Ward, and so there are no specific junior high school zones.

References

Districts of Chiyoda, Tokyo